Tybjerg may refer to:

Places
 Tybjerg, a village in Denmark

Buildings
 Tybjerg Church, a church
 Tybjerg Manor, a manor house and estate

People
 Clara Tybjerg, Danish women's right activist